Hannah Ward Barron (14 July 1829 – 10 November 1898) was a successful businesswoman, hotel proprietor and landowner in New Zealand.

Biography 
She was born in Cork, County Cork, Ireland on 14 July 1829, the oldest daughter and third child of Elizabeth Lynch and shopkeeper Thomas Dorney. Initially, she was given the first name of Joanna, but soon she chose Hannah, instead. In Ireland, she learned how to read, write, sing and play piano and she was raised a devout Roman Catholic, "which sustained her all her life."

Hannah survived an Irish famine (1845 to 1849) and married William Ward "probably on 7 October 1850" in Cork, Ireland. Only a few years later, William Ward set out to London and then Melbourne, Australia, arriving in August 1853. Soon thereafter, while pregnant and toting two infants, Hannah followed him, arriving on 24 October 1853. The young family lived in the Melbourne area but William "did not prosper." To support the family, Hannah went to work, operating a small shop and then a lodging house on Abbotsford Street, providing housing for miners. In time, she gave birth to more children, but her husband and seven of her eight sons died, succumbing to the many diseases that spread throughout the overcrowded city.

She married again on 31 December 1862 to a butcher from Northumberland, England, named John Barron, and from then on was known as Hannah Ward Barron. However, her second marriage was not successful and nine months later, in September 1863, Hannah and her three surviving children sailed for New Zealand. They settled in Campbelltown (now known as Bluff), situated in a southern-most point of New Zealand. Hannah soon opened a shop for miners who worked in nearby goldfields.

Eventually, the goldfields were exhausted and Hannah opened a lodge for sailors located near the wharf. Her business flourished and she borrowed enough money to buy land and convert her boarding house into the Club Hotel in Bluff. There, she thrived as a lodger and landowner and managed the hotel until her death.

Hannah died 10 November 1898 in the Bluff home of her daughter, Mary (Mina) Eliza Frances. She was survived by Mary and her two sons William Thomas Ward and Joseph Ward (1856-1930), who was active in politics and became the 17th prime minister of New Zealand from 1906 to 1912, and again from 1928 to 1930.

References

See also
 Bassett, M. 'In search of Sir Joseph Ward'. New Zealand Journal of History 21, No 1 (1987): 112--124

 

1829 births
1898 deaths
19th-century Irish people
People from County Cork
New Zealand women in business
Irish emigrants to New Zealand (before 1923)
19th-century New Zealand businesspeople
19th-century New Zealand businesswomen